Eudist Lake is a lake in the Côte-Nord region of the province of Quebec, Canada. The Manitou River flows through the lake from north to south, and continues to the Gulf of Saint Lawrence.

The Manitou River crosses the lake from north to south and continues to Gulf of St. Lawrence.

Location

Eudist Lake is in the unorganized territory of Lac-Jérôme in the Minganie Regional County Municipality of Quebec.

This lake has the following bays (clockwise from the mouth): Eugène-Francis Cove, Johnny-Tremblay Bay, Imbeault Bay, Trois Soeurs Bay, baie du Lac in Nazaire, Gaudreau Cove, Pilot Bay, Baie des Tugs.

The mouth of the lake is located at the bottom of a triangular bay in the south-east.

Name

The Innu call the lake Mantu Nipi, meaning "lake of the great spirit", or Manitou.
The French name is in honor of the Congregation of Jesus and Mary, or Eudists, an order that was founded in 1643 in Caen by Saint John Eudes (1601–1680).
The order was broken up during the French Revolution, then reformed in 1826 with the mission of education and propagation of the Christian faith.
The Eudists settled in the Maritimes in 1890, and in Quebec from 1903.
They were given responsibility for the whole of the Côte-Nord, including Anticosti Island, and founded many parishes, missions and schools.
The lake was first given this name in 1916 in the Nomenclature des noms géographiques de la province de Québec published by the Geography Commission.
It was formerly called Lac à Sec (Dry Lake).

Fishing

The main fish species are Brook trout (Salvelinus fontinalis) and Arctic char (Salvelinus alpinus), with trout often weighing .
Fishing is allowed in June and August, but not in July.
At the start of the season the fish are found in the main lakes, but by the end of summer they migrate to the Manitou River.

Notes

Sources

Lakes of Côte-Nord
Minganie Regional County Municipality